Libres may refer to:

 Libres (album), an album by Sonohra
 Libres (municipality), Mexico
 Paso de los Libres, a city in Argentina

See also
 Libre (disambiguation)